Aboubacar Camara (born 3 November 1988) is a Guinean former professional footballer.

References

External links
 
 Profile on Football-LineUps

1988 births
Living people
Guinean footballers
Association football midfielders
Guinean expatriate footballers
Expatriate footballers in Belarus
Guinean expatriate sportspeople in Belarus
Expatriate footballers in Tunisia
Expatriate footballers in Sweden
Guinean expatriate sportspeople in Tunisia
FC Partizan Minsk players
FC Minsk players
ES Métlaoui players
AS Gabès players
EO Sidi Bouzid players
Belarusian Premier League players